Senad Repuh (born 18 December 1972) is a Bosnian football manager and former player who is currently working as an assistant manager at Bosnian Premier League club Sarajevo.

Club career
After passing the club's youth selections, Repuh started his professional career with hometown club Sarajevo in the 1990–91 season. With the start of the Bosnian War and the halt of competitive football in the country, many first team regulars left the club as it became a touring one.

In 1996, after being spotted by scouts during one of the aforementioned tours, Repuh joined French Ligue 1 side Lorient, where he stayed for one season before returning to Sarajevo. In 1997, he made a move to the Turkish Süper Lig, joining Karabükspor and eventually Bursaspor.

After a stint in Israel, playing for Hapoel Jerusalem and Hapoel Tzafririm Holon, Repuh again returned to Sarajevo. He went on to play for Sokol Saratov in the Russian Premier League, Pietà Hotspurs in the Maltese Premier League, and lower-tier Bosnian side SAŠK Napredak before retiring from professional football. Repuh had previously won the Bosnian Premier League with Sarajevo in 2007 before retiring.

International career
Repuh earned 14 caps for the Bosnia and Herzegovina national team between 1997 and 1999. He scored his first and only goal at the 1997 Dunhill Cup, in a game in which Bosnia and Herzegovina beat Vietnam 4–0. His final international was a September 1999 European Championship qualification match away against the Czech Republic.

Managerial career
Repuh succeeded Vlado Jagodić as manager of Jedinstvo Bihać in September 2019, only to be released by them in January 2020.

Career statistics

International goals
|}

Managerial statistics

Honours

Player
Sarajevo
Bosnian Premier League: 2006–07

References

External links

1972 births
Living people
Footballers from Sarajevo
Association football midfielders
Yugoslav footballers
Bosnia and Herzegovina footballers
Bosnia and Herzegovina international footballers
FK Sarajevo players
FC Lorient players
Kardemir Karabükspor footballers
Bursaspor footballers
Hapoel Jerusalem F.C. players
Hapoel Tzafririm Holon F.C. players
FC Sokol Saratov players
Pietà Hotspurs F.C. players
NK SAŠK Napredak players
Yugoslav First League players
Premier League of Bosnia and Herzegovina players
Süper Lig players
Israeli Premier League players
Russian Premier League players
Maltese Premier League players
First League of the Federation of Bosnia and Herzegovina players
Bosnia and Herzegovina expatriate footballers
Expatriate footballers in Turkey
Expatriate footballers in Israel
Expatriate footballers in Russia
Expatriate footballers in Malta
Bosnia and Herzegovina expatriate sportspeople in Turkey
Bosnia and Herzegovina expatriate sportspeople in Israel
Bosnia and Herzegovina expatriate sportspeople in Russia
Bosnia and Herzegovina expatriate sportspeople in Malta
Bosnia and Herzegovina football managers
FK Sarajevo managers
NK Jedinstvo Bihać managers
Premier League of Bosnia and Herzegovina managers